Salihiyya is a tariqa (order) of Sufi Islam prevalent in Somalia and the adjacent Somali region of Ethiopia. It was founded in the Sudan by Sayyid Muhammad Salih (1854-1919). The order is characterized by a puritanism typical of other revivalist movements.

History 

The order ultimately traces its origins back to the Sufi scholar of Moroccan origin Ahmad ibn Idris al-Fasi (1760-1837). His followers and students spread al-Fasi's teachings across the globe. Among his students was Ibrahim ibn Salih ibn ‘Abd al-Rahman al-Duwayhi (1813-1874), known as al-Rashid. In his native Sudan, al-Rashid popularized the teachings of al-Fasi, eventually establishing his own tariqa, the Rashidiyya. Having been at al-Fasi's side when he died, al-Rashid was recognized as the successor to his teacher, and the Rashidiyya found many followers in Mecca. His nephew, Sayyid Muhammad Salih, was one of them; he spread the Rashidiyya to the Sudan and Somalia, establishing his own eponymous branch, the Salihiyya. (However, the order continues to be known as the Rashidiyya in the Sudan.) A former slave, Muhammad Guled (d. 1918), was instrumental in popularizing the Salihiyya in the Jowhar region of Somalia, while Isma'il ibn Ishaq al-Urwayni spread it in the Middle Juba region.  Related orders also spread to Malaysia.

The Salihiyya order, like the closely related Idrisiyya, Rashidiyya, and Sanusiyya orders, is a revivalist reform movement and historically was staunchly opposed to the Qadiriyya order (which is the largest and longest-established in Somalia), taking issue with the Qadiri doctrine of tawassul (intermediation). While the Qadiriyya upheld the traditional Sufi belief in the power of intercession held by dead saints, the Salihiyya maintained that only living saints held this power. The Salihiyya was also militantly anti-colonial. Mohammed Abdullah Hassan, a Salihiyya shaykh and poet, spread the Salihiyya (particularly in Ogaden) and led an armed anticolonial resistance movement in the Horn of Africa under the auspices of the order.

Present 
The Salihiyya remains one of the largest Sufi orders in Somalia, after the Qadiriyya. The opposition between the Salihiyya and the Qadiriyya has also endured into the postcolonial period.

Bibliography 
 Scott Steven Reese: Urban Woes and Pious Remedies: Sufism in Nineteenth-Century Benaadir (Somalia). Africa Today, Vol. 46, No. 3–4, 1999, pp. 169–192.

Notes

Sufi orders
Sufism
Islam in Somalia
Islam in Africa
Sufism in Africa